Morasa may refer to:
Morasa State, a princely state of India merged with Idar State in 1821
Morasa, a synonym for Lymantria, a genus of moths